Simcoe North is a provincial electoral district in Ontario, Canada. It was established as a provincial riding in 1996. Its population was 119,401 in 2006.

Demographics
According to the Canada 2011 Census

Ethnic groups: 88.5% White, 9.0% Aboriginal
Languages: 90.5% English, 3.8% French, 1.4% German 
Religions: 71.7% Christian (28.5% Catholic, 13.0% United Church, 10.1% Anglican, 5.6% Presbyterian, 2.9% Baptist, 1.2% Lutheran, 1.0% Pentecostal, 9.4% Other Christian), 26.9% None. 
Median income: $28,718 (2010) 
Average income: $37,989 (2010)

Geography
The district includes all of the north and eastern parts of Simcoe County. The major municipalities include Midland, Orillia, Penetanguishene, Tay, Tiny, Christian Island, Severn, Ramara, Oro-Medonte and Mnjikaning First Nation The area is 2,381 km2.

Members of Provincial Parliament

Election results

2007 electoral reform referendum

Sources

Elections Ontario Past Election Results
Map of riding for 2018 election

Ontario provincial electoral districts
Midland, Ontario
Orillia
Penetanguishene